The 2010 Sunoco Red Cross Pennsylvania 500 was a NASCAR Sprint Cup Series stock car race held on August 1, 2010 at Pocono Raceway in Long Pond, Pennsylvania. Contested over 200 laps, it was the twenty-first race of the 2010 Sprint Cup Series season. Greg Biffle, driving for Roush Fenway Racing, won the race while Tony Stewart finished second, and Carl Edwards, who started twenty-fifth, clinched third. This race gained popularity due to Elliott Sadler's unseen, yet terrifying crash.

Race report

Background
Prior to the race, Kevin Harvick led the Drivers' Championship with 2,920 points, and Hendrick Motorsports driver Jeff Gordon was second with  2,736 points. Behind them in the Drivers' Championship, Denny Hamlin was third with 2,660 points, and Jimmie Johnson was fourth with 2,659 points. Kurt Busch was fifth with 2,658 points. In the Manufacturers' Championship, Chevrolet was leading with 143 points, twenty points ahead of their rival Toyota. In the battle for third place, Ford had 90 points, six ahead of Dodge.

Practice and qualifying
Three practice sessions were held before the Sunday race, one on Friday and two on Saturday. The first practice session will last 90 minutes, while the Saturday morning will last 50 minutes. The third and final practice session will last 60 minutes. During the first practice session, Jimmie Johnson was quickest, ahead of Denny Hamlin and Ryan Newman in second and third. Kyle Busch followed in the fourth position, while Tony Stewart was scored fifth. During the first Saturday practice session, Jeff Gordon was scored first fastest, ahead of his teammate Johnson and Kevin Harvick in second and third. Jeff Burton followed in the fourth position, ahead of Greg Biffle in fifth. Joey Logano and Johnson followed in the second and third positions. Reed Sorenson scored fourth, ahead of Dale Earnhardt Jr. in fifth.

During qualifying, forty-five drivers were entered, but only the fastest forty-three raced because of NASCAR's qualifying procedure. Stewart clinched the pole position, with a time of 52.511.  He will be joined on the front row of the grid by Juan Pablo Montoya. Hamlin only managed to qualify third, and Gordon qualified fourth.  Newman qualified fifth with a time of 52.961. Johnson, A. J. Allmendinger, Burton, Jamie McMurray and Mark Martin rounded off the top ten. The two drivers that did not qualify were David Stremme and Max Papis.

Race summary
The start of the race was delayed by rain to 1:54 PM.

At the drop of the green flag, Tony Stewart got a good start, and led for three laps before Jeff Gordon overtook him on the Long Pond straightaway. Over the first fifteen laps, there was a significant amount of shuffling further back in the field as Gordon led. On lap 15, a preplanned competition caution was thrown. Gordon continued to lead at the green flag on lap 19, but was passed a lap later by Greg Biffle. Biffle led for two laps before being overtaken by Jimmie Johnson. Biffle was shuffled back to fourth as Gordon and Jeff Burton passed him. By lap 28, Johnson was leading by 1.5 seconds over Gordon.

On lap 34, Dale Earnhardt Jr. got loose in turn 2 but saved his car, and the green flag stayed out. From lap 45 to lap 50, the field cycled through green flag pit stops. When the cycle was completed, Johnson was still leading, and put David Gilliland one lap down. Elliott Sadler was also penalized for speeding with a pass-through penalty. A second cycle of green flag pit stops began on lap 75. Jimmie Johnson was still leading until he pitted on lap 78, giving Jeff Gordon the lead. Gordon led for one lap, as did Carl Edwards, during this cycle of stops. Their leads were brief, as Johnson reclaimed the lead at the conclusion of the cycle. He continued to lead until Gordon overtook him on lap 120.

One lap later, the second caution was thrown for debris. Earnhardt Jr. received the free pass under this caution, having just been put a lap down by Johnson. A two tire stop during caution flag pit stops allowed Greg Biffle to assume the lead. Rain could be seen approaching the track. Biffle led the field to the green flag on lap 126. He led for two laps. On lap 128, Jeff Gordon overtook Biffle in turn 2, then on the Short Chute was overtaken by Denny Hamlin. Hamlin continued to lead until lap 145, when debris in turn one brought out the third caution. Regan Smith received the free pass. Juan Pablo Montoya stayed out and assumed the lead when the field restarted on lap 150. Over the next three laps, the lead would change several times between Gordon and Montoya, until Gordon obtained a solid lead on lap 153. On lap 155, a NASCAR official reported that it was sprinkling in turn 3.

On lap 158, the fourth caution was waved after Dale Earnhardt Jr. spun in turn 1. Sam Hornish Jr. received the free pass, and Gordon continued to lead when the race restarted on lap 162.

Three laps after the restart, the fifth caution was waved because of a large crash in the Long Pond straightaway, which holds the record for hardest recorded impact in NASCAR history. It started when Kurt Busch spun after contact from Jimmie Johnson, got together with Clint Bowyer and then Busch spun into the wall. Elliott Sadler was spun by A. J. Allmendinger, and took a very extreme ride: his car went face-first into the inside wall (effectively the same as hitting the side of a building) at 160 miles per hour, at a nearly perpendicular angle. The entire front part of the car was torn apart. The engine was ripped from the car and parts from it scattered all across the track. The estimated G-forces were the highest seen in any car accident, and Sadler's car went from racing speed of 160 mph to about 20 mph in a braking distance of three feet. Amazingly, Sadler got out of the car and walked away under his own power, though he needed to lie down to get his breath again afterwards before taking the mandatory ambulance ride to the infield care center. Debris from both crashes required a 30-minute red flag for cleanup.

Memorable about the crash was the lack of camera angles for Sadler's crash: the crash occurred in a blind spot on the track. Although almost every camera had a good view of Kurt Busch's car, only one camera actually saw Sadler's impact, and even then, it was on the side of the screen and partially out of frame. Due to rain that started to fall during the red flag, NASCAR decided to run the field under yellow for several laps to allow the track to dry. Most of the field pitted on lap 170, and Sam Hornish Jr. received the lead. Seven laps later, the field was still running under yellow and the race was re-red flagged for 18 minutes.

Hornish led the cars to the green flag on lap 179, and was overtaken a lap later by Greg Biffle. Biffle got a strong lead, and led the last twenty laps to win the race and snap a 64 race winless streak.

Results

Qualifying

Race results

References

Sunoco Red Cross Pennsylvania 500
Sunoco Red Cross Pennsylvania 500
NASCAR races at Pocono Raceway